= Wilfred La Salle =

American film director, producer and screenwriter

- Born: The Bronx, New York City
- Occupations: Film director, producer, screenwriter
- Years active: 2019-present
- Organization: La Salle Productions
- Website: lasalleproductions.com

Wilfred La Salle is an American film director, producer and screenwriter.

As of 2026, he has released an independent film in seven consecutive years, beginning with his short Hilo in 2020.

His feature films, which generally focus on social issues, include Graves (2022), the Security Guard (2025) and The Veteran (2026), which was distributed on Fox Soul.

He is the founder of the production company La Salle Productions.

== Early life ==
Wilfred La Salle was born in the Bronx, New York and grew up in the West Farms neighbourhood. He was raised by his single mother in public housing. He worked for the City of New York for 18 years, first as an NYPD school safety agent and then as a corrections officer.

== Early career ==
La Salle took up filmmaking in 2019, buying camera equipment he did not yet know how to use. He did not attend film school and has said he taught himself using YouTube videos. He initially shot his films during the summer, around the Bronx and Westchester County. He later left his job with the city of New York to pursue filmmaking.

His earliest credited works are the short film Hilo (2020) and its sequel Hilo 2 (2021), both part of a crime trilogy about corrupt police officers fighting a new gang. These were followed by the feature film Graves (2022), which was filmed in Queens. He released a third Hilo film in 2023 before directing and acting in Oculus (2024).

He founded the production company La Salle Productions, through which he makes his films. He has said his films are self-funded, with no sponsors or investors. He works without a traditional crew and shoots guerila style. He has said his actors are unpaid but receive the scenes they are featured in for their acting reels.

== Later Films ==
La Salle's films generally focus on social issues. His 2025 film The Security Guard, a thriller set in Brooklyn, deals with school shootings and gun control. It follows a man working as a safety officer at his young daughter's school when gunfire breaks out. It was filmed in the Bronx and Mount Vernon, New York.

His sevneth film, The Veteran, premiered in March 2026. It centres on a marine veteran Jose Torres, who struggles with opioid addiction and becomes homeless. La Salle has said the film was inspired by the national opioid crisis. He signed a distribution deal with Fox Soul, and the film debuted on the network in May 2026. In a review for The Movie Buff, Mark Ziobro wrote that the film had the flaws to be expected of a small-budget independent production, but called it a "touching picture that garners empathy and heart".

His eighth film, Lucy, follows a non-verbal autistic girl and is told from the perspective of her parents as they come to understand her diagnosis. Although the story is set in Westchester County, it was filmed across New York City and Long Island, as well as in Connecticut and New Jersey. Filming wrapped in late August 2026, with its release planned for April 2027.

== Filmography ==
As director, writer and producer

Year	Title	Format	Notes	References
2020	Hiilo	Short		
2021	Hilo 2	Short		
2022	Graves	Feature		
2023	Hilo 3	Feature		
2024	Oculus	Feature	Also actor	
2025	The Security Guard	Feature		
2026	The Veteran	Feature	Distributed on Fox Soul	
2027	Lucy		Post production; release planned for April 2027	
